City in View is a 1923 German silent drama film directed by Henrik Galeen and starring Harry Nestor, Edith Posca and Friedrich Traeger. It premiered in Berlin on 8 February 1923.

Cast
 Harry Nestor as Fritz
 Edith Posca
 Friedrich Traeger as Ullrich
 Otto Treptow

References

Bibliography

External links

1923 films
Films of the Weimar Republic
German silent feature films
German drama films
Films directed by Henrik Galeen
1923 drama films
Seafaring films
German black-and-white films
UFA GmbH films
Silent drama films
Silent adventure films
1920s German films